Vouillé is a commune in the Deux-Sèvres department in western France. It sits about ten kilometers east from Niort on the banks of the Lambon, where that small river empties into the Sèvre Niortaise.

See also
Communes of the Deux-Sèvres department

References

Communes of Deux-Sèvres